Kanpetlet Township is a township of Mindat District in the Chin State of Myanmar. Its principal town is Kanpetlet.

There are 26 village-tracts and 117 villages in the township, only about 13 villages have access to motor roads and the remaining over 100 villages have to rely on foot to travel from one place to another in 2011. 

In 2014, Kanpetlet township has a population of 21493, according to Myanmar Census Report: census report volume 2 pg. 52. It is one of the most isolated townships in Chin State.

References

Townships of Chin State